Tullinge Triangel Pojkar FK, also known as Tullinge TP Football or Tullinge TP FK, is a Swedish football club based in Tullinge, Stockholm County. They are affiliated to the Stockholms Fotbollförbund and

History
Tullinge TP FK was formed in 1944. The founders were three boys whose houses lay in a triangle relative to each other, hence the club name, which translates as "Tullinge Triangle Boys".

In August 2016, Tullinge defeated FC Stockholm 4–3 in the semi-final of the Stockholm Cup, a result which qualified them for the 2017-18 Svenska Cupen. In the Stockholm Cup final, they lost 5–4 to IFK Haninge in front of 400 spectators.

Tullinge and Haninge met again in the first round of the Svenska Cupen, with Tullinge winning 4–3. In the second round, Tullinge lost 5–2 against Superettan team IK Frej.

Stadium
The club's home venue is at Brantbrinks IP, a general sports ground located on the Flottilj road outside Tullinge. There the club has two full-size pitches with artificial grass, where all teams train and play their matches. The club also has their offices as well as a clubhouse with cafeteria, conference room and youth café and storage facilities.

Current squad

References

External links
 

Association football clubs established in 1944
1944 establishments in Sweden
Football clubs in Stockholm